Congruence bias is the tendency of people to over-rely on testing their initial hypothesis (the most congruent one) while neglecting to test alternative hypotheses. That is, people rarely try experiments that could disprove their initial belief, but rather try to repeat their initial results. It is a special case of the confirmation bias.

Examples
Suppose that, in an experimental setting, a subject is presented with two buttons and told that pressing one of those buttons, but not the other, will open a door. The subject adopts the hypothesis that the button on the left opens the door in question. A direct test of this hypothesis would be pressing the button on the left; an indirect test would be pressing the button on the right. The latter is still a valid test because once the result of the door's remaining closed is found, the left button is proven to be the desired button. (This example is parallel to Bruner, Goodnow, and Austin's example in the psychology classic, A Study of Thinking.)

It is possible to take this idea of direct and indirect testing and apply it to more complicated experiments in order to explain the presence of a congruence bias in people. In an experiment, a subject will test his own usually naive hypothesis again and again instead of trying to disprove it.

The classic example of subjects' congruence bias was discovered by Peter Wason (1960, 1968).  Here, the experimenter gave subjects the number sequence "2, 4, 6", telling the subjects that this sequence followed a particular rule and instructing subjects to find the rule underlying the sequence logic. Subjects provided their own number sequences as tests to see if they could ascertain the rule dictating which numbers could be included in the sequence and which could not. Most subjects respond to the task by quickly deciding that the underlying rule is "numbers ascending by 2", and provide as tests only sequences concordant with this rule, such as "3, 5, 7," or even "pi plus 2, plus 4, plus 6". Each of these sequences follows the underlying rule the experimenter is thinking of, though "numbers ascending by 2" is not the actual criterion being used. However, because subjects succeed at repeatedly testing the same singular principle, they naively believe their chosen hypothesis is correct. When a subject offers up to the experimenter the hypothesis "numbers ascending by 2" only to be told he is wrong, much confusion usually ensues. At this point, many subjects attempt to change the wording of the rule without changing its meaning, and even those who switch to indirect testing have trouble letting go of the "+ 2" convention, producing potential rules as idiosyncratic as "the first two numbers in the sequence are random, and the third number is the second number plus two". Many subjects never realize that the actual rule the experimenter was using was simply just to list ascending numbers, because of the subjects' inability to consider indirect tests of their hypotheses.

Cognitive basis
Wason attributed this failure of subjects to an inability to consider alternative hypotheses, which is the root of the congruence bias. Jonathan Baron explains that subjects could be said to be using a "congruence heuristic", wherein a hypothesis is tested only by thinking of results that would be found if that hypothesis is true. This heuristic, which many people seem to use, ignores alternative hypotheses.

Baron suggests the following heuristics to avoid falling into the congruence bias trap:
 Ask "How likely is a yes answer, if I assume that my hypothesis is false?" Remember to choose a test that has a high probability of giving some answer if the hypothesis is true, and a low probability if it is false.
 "Try to think of alternative hypotheses; then choose a test most likely to distinguish them—a test that will probably give different results depending on which is true." An example of the need for the heuristic could be seen in a doctor's attempting to diagnose appendicitis. In that situation, assessing a white blood cell count would not assist in diagnosis because an elevated white blood cell count is associated with a number of maladies.

See also 
 List of cognitive biases

References

Bibliography

Reference books

Cognitive biases
Cognition
Cognitive science